Valentin Krempl (15 April 1904 – 1944) was a German bobsledder who competed in the late 1920s. He won a bronze medal in the five-man event at the 1928 Winter Olympics in St. Moritz. This was the first medal Germany had ever earned at the Winter Olympics.

References
Bobsleigh five-man Olympic medalists for 1928
DatabaseOlympics.com profile

1904 births
1944 deaths
German male bobsledders
Bobsledders at the 1928 Winter Olympics
Olympic bobsledders of Germany
Olympic bronze medalists for Germany
Olympic medalists in bobsleigh
Medalists at the 1928 Winter Olympics